Futurama Comics is a comic book series based on the television show Futurama published by Bongo Comics. It has been published bi-monthly in the United States since November 2000 (apart from a brief break for the crossover). It has been published in the United Kingdom (with an altered order) and Australia since 2002 and four trade paperbacks have been released. During the production hiatus between 2003 and 2006 and from 2013 to present, it was the only new Futurama material being made. The comic book series continues its run, even after two cancellations of the TV series. Issues #82 and #83 were distributed via the Futuramaland app, and will not be physically printed.

Premise
In the year 3000, the crew of the Planet Express delivery company make cargo shipments to unusual planets, as well as having adventures back on Earth. The main characters include Philip J. Fry, a slacker from the 20th century who was cryogenically frozen for 1,000 years, cycloptic ship captain Leela, and an alcohol-fueled, troublemaking robot Bender. The comic will often make more use of supporting or minor characters than the series, such as Zapp Brannigan, Cubert Farnsworth, the Robot Devil and Inez Wong.

Format
Each issue consists of at least one story of around 27 pages (occasionally brief stories also appear), and a letters and fanart page. There are also full-page mock advertisements marketing futuristic products (such as Brain Slugs), which parody the kinds of coupon offers found in other comic books.
Special editions of some issues are published on occasion; a variant of the first issue available only at Comic Con 2000 featured a golden background, rather than red.

In a similar vein to the parent series, each issue features a humorous caption on the cover (for example, "Made In The USA! (Printed in Canada)"). These captions also vary according to where it is sold. Coinciding with the change in format in issue 59, the caption was abandoned, along with the original logo.  Each issue is a self-contained story which lasts one issue (though the Time Bender Trilogy spanned three issues) and it is printed in the standard 6⅝" x 10¼" size.

After issue 81, the print edition was cancelled and issue 82 was released as a digital-only comic.

Issues

Specials
In 2002, it was announced that a special two-part crossover with the characters of Simpsons Comics would be printed. The mini-series was written by Ian Boothby and pencilled by James Lloyd. It was followed by another special in 2005.

Futurama Comics #1 (San Diego Comic-Con Exclusive 2000)
A limited-edition variant of Futurama Comics #1, exclusive to San Diego Comic-Con 2000.

Futurama/Simpsons Infinitely Secret Crossover Crisis

The Simpsons/Futurama Crossover Crisis II

Futurama Returns (San Diego Comic-Con 2007 Exclusive)
A limited-edition teaser for the direct-to-DVD Futurama movies. A live reading of the comic by most of the original cast was included as an extra on the DVD of Bender's Big Score.

Delivery-Boy Man (San Diego Comic-Con 2010 Exclusive)
This comic was only available at San Diego Comic-Con 2010.  It is based on the comic Fry wrote in the episode "Lrrreconcilable Ndndifferences", which had not aired at the time the comic was released.

Futurama Comics to Infinity! (San Diego Comic-Con 2013 Exclusive)
A 104-page collection featuring issues 23, 37, 39, and 45.

Variations
Titan Magazines began printing Futurama Comics in the United Kingdom in 2002, with the first issue going on sale on October 3. The UK version is a larger A4 size and there is a sidebar on the front cover previewing what is inside. The same content is featured in these issues as in the United States, but there are also competitions and more "fan art". The order of release is altered from the original line-up; the crossovers were published as part of the main series, pushing some issues back. US issue 7 was published as UK issue 6 to coincide with the release of Terminator 3: Rise of the Machines. Captions are also changed as well, with the aforementioned issue changed to "Rise of the Machines!" and issue 3 reading "New Version 5.0!" on account of it being printed two issues later. "DOOP the Right Thing" was not published until issue 9.

Until issue 14, the comics were published bi-monthly. From issue 15 until issue 44 they were published monthly and, to avoid catching up with the US issues (which were by now quarterly), the issues were then split in two, though "Bender Breaks Out" was published as a full issue as otherwise the story does not make sense. From issue 45 onwards the comics are reverting to bi-monthly. 
Special promotional editions are also published; a miniature edition of "DOOP the Right Thing" was included with an issue of the UK Simpsons Comics.

Titan ceased publishing Futurama Comics in the UK with the release of issue 67 (US issues 67 and 68) in August, 2013.

The comic began publishing in Australia in 2002 and follows the same release pattern as the US. However, until issue 16, they were published quarterly, going bi-monthly in late 2005. There are variations in the captions used; "A Fit Worse Than Death" was originally printed without one, with the Australian publishers adding "Medicine In The 31st Century".

Trade paperbacks

Futurama-O-Rama: Collects Issues #1-4 (November 2002)
Futurama Adventures: Collects Issues #5-9 (September 2004)
The Time Bender Trilogy: Collects Issues #16-19 (July 2006)
Futurama Conquers The Universe: Collects Issues #10-13 (October 2007)
The Simpsons / Futurama Crossover Crisis: Collects Futurama/Simpsons Infinitely Secret Crossover Crisis #1-2, Simpsons/Futurama Crossover Crisis II #1-2, excerpts from Simpsons Comics #87 and Simpsons Summer Shindig #2, and a reprint of Simpsons Comics #1 (March 2010)

References

External links
Official Futurama Comics catalog
Futurama covers gallery
Comic Listing at the Infosphere

Comic
Comics
Bongo Comics titles
Titan Magazines titles
Publications established in 2000
Comics based on television series
Comics set in New York City
Comics set in the 31st century
Comics set on fictional planets